Rupert Joel Degas (born 17 August 1970) is an Anglo-Australian actor. He is best known for his voice work in animation and audiobooks. Since the 1980s, he has worked in audiobooks, film, podcasts, radio productions, television, theatre, and video games, and as a producer.

Early life and education
Degas was born on 17 August 1970 in London, to producer and screenwriter Brian Degas and radio/television presenter Maggie Clews. He was educated at Hill House School in Knightsbridge and Emanuel School in Wandsworth.

Career

Animation
Best known as the voices of Zoomer and Scrambler in Bob the Builder from 2004 to 2011, he got his voice acting career for animation, including Chop Socky Chooks, Robotboy, Thomas & Friends and The Amazing World of Gumball.  He also played several characters in the animated feature film Planet 51.    

Since moving to Australia, Degas has provided voices for The Wild Adventures of Blinky Bill, Kitty Is Not a Cat, The Strange Chores, Maya the Bee: The Honey Games, Bluey, Alien TV, Kangaroo Beach, 100% Wolf, and Peter Rabbit 2: The Runaway. In 2021, he narrated two episodes of The Wheel of Time.

Audiobook narration
Degas has narrated over 300 audiobooks. He has received particular critical acclaim for his performances of The Name of the Wind by Patrick Rothfuss, and Skulduggery Pleasant by Derek Landy. Degas says of audiobooks, "I do accents. It's my specialty." The Guardian called his voice performances "shape-shifting".. In 2022, Degas was inducted as a Golden Voice by AudioFile magazine.

Film and television
Degas' first film appearance was in Jerry Schatzberg's Reunion, followed by television appearances in Dead Romantic, Over Here, A Touch of Frost and Passport to Murder.  Other notable television appearances include EastEnders, Lovejoy, Van Der Valk, Waiting For God, Lycée Alpin, Holby City, Love Soup, Shoot the Messenger, Nathan Barley, and Red Dwarf. Degas also provided the voice of the demon in both Exorcist: The Beginning and the 2013 film Evil Dead.

Theatre
Having been a regular Newsrevue performer at the Canal Café Theatre and at the Edinburgh Fringe, Degas made his West End theatre debut in Stones in His Pockets at The Duke of York's Theatre and the New Ambassadors Theatre, and then in the original Olivier Award winning London cast of The 39 Steps at The Tricycle Theatre before transferring to The Criterion Theatre in Piccadilly Circus.  He has also performed in several plays at The Battersea Arts Centre, Latchmere Theatre and The Southwark Playhouse.

Radio and podcasts
On radio, Degas has performed in over eighty plays and series, most notably Grovers Mill, and the BBC productions of The Brightonomicon, Dirk Gently, The Hitchhiker's Guide to the Galaxy, and Starship Titanic.  He also played Pantalaimon in the full cast audio production of His Dark Materials.  Degas is also a regular contributor to the weekly satirical podcast A Rational Fear.

Awards and honours
 AudioFile Earphones Award - 18 honours as of April 2022.
 2008 Odyssey Award for Skulduggery Pleasant
 2021 Australian Book Industry Awards (ABIAs) - Shortlisted for Audiobook of the Year - Mammoth by Chris Flynn
 2022 AudioFile Golden Voice

References

External links
 Rupert Degas Website
 
 Rupert Degas at Naxos

1970 births
Living people
20th-century British male actors
21st-century British male actors
Audiobook narrators
English film producers
English male child actors
English male film actors
English male stage actors
English male television actors
English male voice actors
English voice directors
Australian male child actors
Australian male film actors
Australian male stage actors
Australian male television actors
Australian male voice actors
People educated at Emanuel School
People educated at Hill House School
Blinky Bill
English emigrants to Australia
English expatriates in the United States
Australian expatriate male actors in the United States